The University of Texas Health Science Center at San Antonio (UT Health San Antonio) is a public academic health science center in San Antonio, Texas. It is part of the University of Texas System.

UT Health San Antonio is the largest health sciences university in South Texas. It is located in the South Texas Medical Center and serves San Antonio and all of the  area of Central and South Texas. It extends to campuses in the Texas border communities of Laredo and the Lower Rio Grande Valley.

UT Health San Antonio has produced more than 39,700 graduates; more than 3,400 students a year train in an environment that involves more than 100 affiliated hospitals, clinics and health care facilities in South Texas. The university offers more than 65 degrees, the large majority of them being graduate and professional degrees, in the biomedical and health sciences fields.

UT Health San Antonio is home to the Mays Cancer Center, which is in partnership with the MD Anderson Cancer Center and is a designated a National Cancer Institute Cancer Center. The Mays Cancer Center's Institute for Drug Development (IDD) is internationally recognized for conducting one of the largest oncology Phase I clinical drug trials programs in the world. Fifteen of the cancer drugs most recently approved by the U.S. Food & Drug Administration underwent development or testing at the IDD.  Other noted programs include: cellular and structural biology, urology, nephrology, transplantation biology, aging and longevity studies, cardiology and research imaging. UT Health San Antonio publishes a periodic magazine, Mission.

History

 1959: South Texas Medical School is chartered.
 1966: First class of 15 students is admitted to the Medical School; temporarily housed at Trinity University.
 1969: Legislature authorizes creation of Dental School.
 1970: Legislature authorizes School of Nursing.
 1972: School of Allied Health Sciences and Graduate School of Biomedical Sciences created Institution is officially designated The University of Texas Health Science Center at San Antonio. Frank Harrison, M.D., Ph.D., appointed first president.
 1976: Responsibility for the School of Nursing is transferred to the U. T. Health Science Center from the U. T. Nursing School at Austin.
 1987: Gift of $15 million from H. Ross Perot finances creation of Institute of Biotechnology.
 1992: National Institutes of Health funds HSC researchers' work on the Human Genome Project.
 1998: State Legislature authorizes creation of a Regional Academic Health Center in the Lower Rio Grande Valley (RAHC), to be administered by the Health Science Center’s Medical School.
 1999: Health Science Center is designated to receive a $200 million public endowment from the State of Texas to establish a Children’s Cancer Research Institute Construction begins on   South Texas Centers for Biology in Medicine at the Texas Research Park.
 2002: The Regional Academic Health Center in the Lower Rio Grande Valley (RAHC) opens its doors for medical students and residents.

 2003: Health Science Center receives largest grant to date for a $37 million study of small subcortical strokes. Health Science Center and UT San Antonio   establish the San Antonio Life Sciences Institute, a   collaborative research and education partnership. A $300 million initiative announced to build a Research Tower in the South Texas Medical Center and recruit leading scientists for it.
 2004: Health Science Center dedicates $50 million Children's Cancer Research Institute.
 2006: The Regional Academic Health Center - Medical Research Division (E-RAHC)  was dedicated April 25, 2006 on the campus of UT Pan American in Edinburg. Also administered by the Health Science Center, this division provides  laboratory space and equipment for   research on critical health problems of the South Texas/Border Region.
 2007: Health Science Center receives a $25 million donation from the Greehey Family Foundation.
 2007: Valero Energy Corporation donates $5 million to the university.
 2007: The Cancer Therapy & Research Center is acquired by the Health Science Center.
 2007: Health Science Center receives a $25 million donation from Joe R. and Teresa Lozano Long. The central campus is renamed the Joe R. and Teresa Lozano Long Campus.
 2007: The second facility was dedicated at The Regional Academic Health Center in the Lower Rio Grande Valley campus - the Academic and Clinical Research building. This facility houses the RAHC clinical research center and also the South Texas VA Health Care Center.
 2008: University Hospital announces plans for a $1 billion expansion that includes a new trauma tower.
 2011: The Liaison Committee on Medical Education (LCME) put the Medical School on probation. The LCME cited curricular issues as a central feature that prompted the probationary status 
 2013: The Liaison Committee on Medical Education (LCME) removed the Medical School from its probation list.

Failed merger with University of Texas at San Antonio
State Senator Leticia Van de Putte championed the creation of a special advisory group that would research the benefits of a possible merger between the Health Science Center and the University of Texas at San Antonio (UTSA), which is also located on the city's northwest side. In 2010, the special advisory group, headed by Peter Flawn, former president of both UTSA and the University of Texas at Austin, concluded that a merger would not be in the best interest of the two institutions. Among its key arguments were that both institutions had strong leadership already on a positive trajectory, the merger would be a short-term distraction for UTHSCSA and the benefit to UTSA's national stature would be slight.

The Health Science Center has a public-private partnership that is designed to promote   research at the institution. The $300 million project,  titled "The Campaign for the Future of Health", seeks to build new infrastructure with the South Texas Research Facility and the President's Excellence Fund.

Campuses

The university is one of four medical schools in the University of Texas System. UT Austin's Pharmacy School is also partially located on this campus. The school has eight campuses, spanning  in total:
 Joe R. and Teresa Lozano Long Campus
 Greehey Academic and Research Campus
Center for Oral Health Care & Research (COHR)
 Texas Research Park Campus
 Medical Arts & Research Center
 Cancer Therapy & Research Center at UT Health San Antonio 
 Laredo
 Regional Academic Health Center (RAHC) Harlingen
 Regional Academic Health Center - Edinburg (ERAHC) Edinburg

Campus design

The campus has a postmodern architecture, with several notable architects contributing to the design of the campus buildings, namely:
 Rafael Vinoly: South Texas Research Facility
 HKS, Inc.: The Administration Building
 Overland Partners Architects: The Barshop Institute, and the downtown University Hospital expansion project.
 FKP Architects: Medical Arts and Research Center (MARC) 
 Perkins + Will: The new annex of the University Hospital.
 Kell Muñoz Architects: Dolph Briscoe Jr. Library

Teaching hospitals and clinics
 University Hospital (ranked as one of the Top 50 hospitals in the US for seven years in a row, in 2007)
 UT Dentistry outpatient clinic
 Audie L. Murphy Memorial VA Hospital 
 Christus Santa Rosa medical center
 San Antonio State Hospital
 Brooke Army Medical Center (Fort Sam Houston)
 Wilford Hall Medical Center (USAF)
 Faculty Practice Plan: UT Health Physicians

Rankings and research

Rankings
 The university was 51st in the world in the Academic Ranking of World Universities 2011 clinical medicine rankings.
The University of Texas Health Science Center at San Antonio selected to Forbes Best-In-State Employers 2021 list.

Research
 CTRC is one of four National Cancer Institute (NCI)-designated cancer centers in the state of Texas.
 The liver transplant program is ranked 9th largest and most successful in the nation.
Named a National Center of Excellence in Women's Health, by the U.S. Secretary of Health & Human Services
 Selected as National Institute of Aging-designated Alzheimer’s Disease Research Center (ADRC).
 Developed the UT Diabetic Wound Classification and ranked 20th in the world for diabetic foot research.

Schools
 School of Dentistry: Community Dentistry, Comprehensive Dentistry, Dental Diagnostic Science, Endodontics, General Dentistry, Oral and Maxillofacial Surgery, Orthodontics, Pediatric Dentistry, Periodontics, Prosthodontics, Restorative Dentistry.
 Graduate School of Biomedical Sciences: Biochemistry, Biomedical Engineering, Cellular and Structural Biology, Clinical Investigation, Clinical Lab Sciences, dental  Hygiene, Dentistry, Microbiology and Immunology, Molecular Medicine, Pathology, Pharmacology, Pharmacy, Nursing, Physiology, Radiological Sciences.
 Medical School: Anesthesiology, Emergency Medicine, Family and Community Medicine, Medicine, Obstetrics and Gynecology, Ophthalmology, Orthopaedics, Pediatrics, Psychiatry, Radiation Oncology, Rehabilitation Medicine, Surgery, Urology.
 School of Health Professions: Clinical Laboratory Sciences,  Dental Hygiene, Dental Laboratory Sciences, Dietetics, Emergency Health Sciences, Occupational Therapy, Physician Assistant Studies, Physical Therapy, Respiratory Care, Speech-Language Pathology.
 School of Nursing: Acute Nursing Care, Chronic Nursing Care, Family Nursing Care.
 College of Pharmacy (affiliated with University of Texas at Austin)
 School of Public Health (affiliated with University of Texas Health Science Center at Houston)

Centers and institutes

 Addiction Research Treatment and Training Center of Excellence
 Academic Center for Evidence-Based Practice
 Aging Research and Education Center
 American Parkinson's Disease Association Information and Referral Center
 Biomolecular Structure Analysis
 Center for Analytical Ultracentrifugation of Macromolecular Assemblies
 Center for Biomedical Neuroscience
 Center for Biomolecular NMR Spectroscopy
 Center for Health Economics and Policy
 Center for Integrative Health
 Center for Public Health Preparedness and Biomedical Research
 Center for Community Based Health Promotion in Women and Children
 Center for Medical Humanities and Ethics
 Center for Neurosurgical Sciences
 Center for Oral Health Care & Research
 Center for Surface Plasmon Resonance
 Center for Violence Prevention
 Children's Cancer Research Institute
 Comparative Mouse Genomics Center
 Cancer Therapy & Research Center
 Environmental Hazards Research Center
 Frederic C. Bartter General Clinical Research Center
 Geriatric Research, Education and Clinical Center
 Hartford Center of Excellence for Geriatrics Education
 Hemophilia Treatment Center
 Injury Prevention and Research Center
 Institute of Biotechnology
 Institutional Flow Cytometry Core Facility
 Lions Sight Research Foundation
 MESA: Center for Health Disparities
 Nathan Shock Center of Excellence in the Basic Biology of Aging
 Regional Center for Health Workforce Studies at CHEP
 Research Imaging Center
 Sam and Ann Barshop Institute for Longevity and Aging Studies
 San Antonio Cancer Institute
 START/South Texas Addiction Research and Technology Center
 South Texas AIDS Center for Children and Their Families
 South Texas Center for Health Disparities
 South Texas Environmental Education and Research Center
 South Texas Fertility Center
 South Texas Health Research Center
 South Texas Poison Center
 South Texas Women's Health Center
 Southwest Research Consortium
 Texas Cancer Clinic
 Texas Center for the Study of Children With Special Health Care Needs
 Texas Diabetes Institute
 VERDICT - Veterans Evidence-based Research Dissemination Implementation Center

Notable alumni

Kyle Altman (born 1986) - ex-professional soccer player, orthopedist
Sharon Bannister - dentist, director of medical ops in the Office of the Surgeon General of the United States Air Force
Heidi Chumley - physician, academic, dean of Ross University School of Medicine
Ivan Edwards - flight surgeon, community activist, humanitarian
Lawrence B. Harkless - podiatrist, academic, retired department head
Mariannette Miller-Meeks (born 1955) - physician, politician
Anita Thigpen Perry (born 1952) - nurse, ex-First Lady of Texas (longest serving)
George M. Rapier III - physician executive, entrepreneur
Susan Weintraub - scientist, academic, director of mass spectrometry

See also
 University of Texas System
 San Antonio
 South Texas Medical Center

References

 
Health Science Center at San Antonio
Universities and colleges accredited by the Southern Association of Colleges and Schools
Education in Laredo, Texas
Universities and colleges in San Antonio
Clock towers in Texas
Healthcare in San Antonio
Educational institutions established in 1959
1959 establishments in Texas